Pirkko Irmeli Ekström (née Pihlajamäki; 16 November 1945 – 17 August 2011) was a Finnish chess player and a Finnish Women Chess Championship medalist (1976, 1982, 1984).

Biography
From the mid-1970s to the mid-1980s, Pirkko Irmeli Ekström was one of Finland's leading chess players. In Finnish Chess Championships she has won silver (1982) and two bronze (1976, 1984) medals. In 1985, in Eksjö Pirkko Irmeli Ekström participated in Women's World Chess Championship Zonal tournament.

Pirkko Irmeli Ekström played for Finland in the Women's Chess Olympiads:
 In 1976, at second board in the 7th Chess Olympiad (women) in Haifa (+1, =3, -5),
 In 1978, at third board in the 8th Chess Olympiad (women) in Buenos Aires (+4, =4, -3),
 In 1980, at first reserve board in the 9th Chess Olympiad (women) in Valletta (+2, =4, -4),
 In 1982, at third board in the 10th Chess Olympiad (women) in Lucerne (+5, =2, -3),
 In 1984, at first reserve board in the 26th Chess Olympiad (women) in Thessaloniki (+5, =4, -2).

References

External links

Pirkko Irmeli Ekström chess games at 365chess.com

1945 births
2011 deaths
Finnish chess players
Chess Olympiad competitors
20th-century chess players